Republic is a city in Republic County, Kansas, United States.  As of the 2020 census, the population of the city was 82.

History
Republic was founded in 1871. It was named from Republic County.

Geography
Republic is located at  (39.923636, -97.822412).

Demographics

2010 census
As of the census of 2010, there were 116 people, 61 households, and 34 families living in the city. The racial makeup of the city was 95.7% White, 3.4% Native American, and 0.9% from two or more races.

There were 61 households, of which 14.8% had children under the age of 18 living with them, 47.5% were married couples living together, 8.2% had a female householder with no husband present, and 44.3% were non-families. 39.3% of all households were made up of individuals, and 16.4% had someone living alone who was 65 years of age or older. The average household size was 1.90 and the average family size was 2.47.

The median age in the city was 52.5 years. 14.7% of residents were under the age of 18; 4.2% were between the ages of 18 and 24; 16.4% were from 25 to 44; 43.1% were from 45 to 64, and 21.6% were 65 years of age or older. The gender makeup of the city was 50.0% male and 50.0% female.

2000 census
As of the census of 2000, there were 161 people, 84 households, and 49 families living in the city. The racial makeup of the city was 99.38% White and 0.62% Native American. Hispanic or Latino of any race were 1.86% of the population.

There were 84 households, out of which 20.2% had children under the age of 18 living with them, 54.8% were married couples living together, 4.8% had a female householder with no husband present, and 40.5% were non-families. 38.1% of all households were made up of individuals, and 21.4% had someone living alone who was 65 years of age or older. The average household size was 1.92 and the average family size was 2.50.

In the city, the population was spread out, with 18.0% under the age of 18, 24.8% from 25 to 44, 29.8% from 45 to 64, and 27.3% who were 65 years of age or older. The median age was 50 years. For every 100 females, there were 96.3 males. For every 100 females age 18 and over, there were 97.0 males.

The median income for a household in the city was $27,679, and the median income for a family was $33,750. Males had a median income of $26,250 versus $16,250 for females. The per capita income for the city was $18,399. About 8.7% of families and 9.7% of the population were below the poverty line, including 31.6% of those under the age of eighteen and none of those 65 or over.

Points of interest
The Pawnee Indian Museum State Historic Site is an archaeological site and museum, located near Republic.  It is listed in the National Register of Historic Places under the name Pawnee Indian Village Site.  To archaeologists, the site is known as 14RP1.

Education
The community is served by Republic County USD 109 public school district. It was formed in 2006 by the consolidation of Belleville USD 427 and Hillcrest USD 455.  The Republic County High School mascot is Republic County Buffaloes.

Republic schools were closed through school unification. The Republic Wildcats won the Kansas State High School boys class BB Indoor Track & Field championship in 1965.

References

Further reading

External links
 Republic - Directory of Public Officials
 Republic city map, KDOT

Cities in Republic County, Kansas
Cities in Kansas